Alwan Al-Abousi (born December 12, 1944) is a retired Iraqi Air Force Major General. He was born in Basra, Iraq and attended to join the Iraqi Air Force Academy in 1961 and was commissioned as a MiG-17 fighter pilot in 1965. He graduated with a B.Sc in Aviation Science from the Egyptian Air Force Academy in 1970. Subsequently, he received an MA in military science from the Iraqi Staff College at Al-Bakr University. His foreign military training includes training in Egypt, India, Russia, France, and Greece. During the Iran–Iraq War, he served as commander of multiple squadrons, groups, and air bases. Late in the war, he became the director and deputy commander of air force training. In the early 1990s, General Abousi became the dean of the national defense for higher political and military studies, and later the commander of air force administration.

Military biography
Major General Alwan Al-Abousi Almost participated in all the wars fought by the Iraqi Air Force, 1967 Six-Day War, Iraqi army movements in national security 1974–1975, the first Persian Gulf War September 1980 to August 1988, and the Gulf War 2 August 1990 – 17 January 1991) operation Desert Storm was a war waged by coalition forces from 34 nations led by the United States against Iraq in response to Iraq's invasion and annexation of Kuwait.

Other work
He became a lawyer after he studied and graduated from Baghdad University, and author of books in the history of the Iraqi AF since its inception on April 22, 1931 until 2003 capabilities and strategic roles to the Iraqi Air Force, When we embrace the sky, Fighter pilot diary and others.

Education
 1970 Bachelor of Aviation Degree, Egyptian Air Force Academy.
 1989 Master of Military Science (Iraqi Staff College) National Defense College.
 1989 Fellow of the Egyptian Military Academy – Nasser Academy of Higher Military Studies Cairo.
 High National Defense Diploma from Al-Bakr University Centre for Military and Strategic Studies,Baghdad.
 Doctorate Degree Political Science – The Hague University – Netherlands.

Assignments
 Basic aviation course in Egypt Bilbeis Air Base
 Flight information service in Baghdad
 Flight instructor courses in Baghdad
 Air combat formations leaders courses
 Air War ground common course in (India) JWS
 Ground formations commanders course Baghdad
 Iraqi Staff College course
 Higher War Academies course, Nasser Military Academy (Cairo)
 National Defense course at Al-Baker University, Strategic and Military Higher Studies
 Many developmental courses and specialist inside and outside Iraq (e.g., Russia, France, Greece, India)

Flight information
 Rating: Command pilot.
 Flight hours: 3,400 hours as a fighter pilot.
 Aircraft flown: MiG-17, MiG-21, MiG-23, MiG-29, Sukhoi Su-7, Sukhoi Su-22, Mirage F1, SEPECAT Jaguar, Tupolev Tu-22

Promotion dates

   First class Iraqi Air Force Medal
   First Class Golden Jubilee Medal of Iraqi Army
   Second class Al-Rafedain Decoration
   Medal of Courage x 4 
   Medal of Higher Merit
   October War 1973
   Iraqi Victory Medal
   Iraqi army movements in national security
   Iraqi Cooperation Medal
   Civil Service Medal
   Medal for Revolution of 17 July 1968

References

 Defense Dept., National Defense University, Institute for Defense Analyses
 MilitaryHistoryOnline.com
 group73

1944 births
Living people
Iraqi generals
Military leaders of the Gulf War
The Hague University of Applied Sciences alumni
Egyptian Air Academy alumni
Egyptian Military Academy alumni
Six-Day War pilots